David Lindgren (born 28 April 1982 in Skellefteå, Sweden) is a Swedish singer, musical actor and television presenter. He is signed to the EMI Sweden label.

In 2009, he appeared on the Swedish television show Så ska det låta on SVT in the same team as Kicki Danielsson and Putte Nelsson. In 2010, he appeared on the show for a second time with Jessica Heribertsson. His third appearance on the same popular show was on 20 January 2013, competing together with teammate Jennifer Brown.

Melodifestivalen
In 2012, he took part in the Swedish Melodifestivalen 2012. In the second heat, his song "Shout It Out" co-written by Fernando Fuentes and Tony Nilsson made it to the Globen final on 10 March 2012 and finished 4th overall.
He participated in Melodifestivalen 2013 with the song "Skyline" co-written by Fernando Fuentes, Henrik Nordenback and Christian Fast. After his performance in an initial semi-final round on 2 February 2013, he finished 1st/2nd – advancing directly to the Melodifestivalen finals which were held on 9 March 2013, where he finished 8th, with 69 points.
He participated in Melodifestivalen 2016 with "We Are Your Tomorrow". After performing the second semi-final on 13 February, he moved to the Melodifestivalen finals to be held on 12 March 2016. He finished 11th, with 39 points.
On 30 September 2016, SVT announced that Lindgren will host all six shows of Melodifestivalen 2017 alongside Clara Henry and Hasse Andersson. On 2 November 2017, SVT announced that Lindgren alone will host all six shows of Melodifestivalen 2018, along with his sidekick Fab Freddie.

Personal life
Lindgren is married to Kristina Lindgren, they have a son named Ben, born in 2011 and a daughter, Ella.

Discography

Albums

Singles

References

External links
 
  

Living people
1982 births
People from Skellefteå Municipality
21st-century Swedish singers
21st-century Swedish male singers
Melodifestivalen contestants of 2016
Melodifestivalen contestants of 2013
Melodifestivalen contestants of 2012